Mann Ke Moti (English: Pearls of Heart) is a 2013 Pakistani family drama television series premiered on Geo TV on 23 February 2013. It was produced by Asif Raza Mir and Babar Javed under their banner A&B Entertainment.

The first season of the show was broadcast in India from 25 February 2015 to 23 May 2015 on Zindagi as Khel Qismat Ka. The second season was broadcast under the title Mann Ke Moti Season 2.

Cast 
 Yasra Rizvi as Fariha (Lead Female Character)
 Faysal Qureshi as Rahil (Fariha's 1st Husband)
 Asma Abbas as Nasreen (Rahil's Mother)
 Waseem Abbas as Farhan (Fariha's 2nd Husband)
 Arjumand Rahim as (Raheel's 2nd Wife)
 Sonia Kazmi as Falak (Young)
 Zuhab Khan as Guddu (Young) / Ahmed  (Babloo)
 Fiza Arif as Hina (young)
 Mona Shah as Falak
 Suhaee Abro as Hina
 Faizan Khawaja as Daniyal
 Jinaan Hussain as Zara
 Aiman Khan as Sehrish
 Minal Khan as Kaavish
 Mizna Waqas as Maham
 Birjees Farooqui as Rahat
 Faizan Shaikh as Asfaq (Maham's Husband)
 Fareeha Jabeen as Maham's Mother-in-law
 Omer Shahzad

Reception
First season was acclaimed it was praised by its touching story, emotional reach and aim. Average score was 5 TRPs and highest score was 7.8. However, second season was not that good as first fans were complaining about story, pace and cast. Average score was 2 while highest score was around 5. The drama was chosen for Indian channel Zindagi (TV channel) under the title "Khel Qismat Ka".

References

Geo TV original programming
Pakistani drama television series
2014 Pakistani television series debuts
Urdu-language television shows
A&B Entertainment
Zee Zindagi original programming